Sopra is a village located in the Bhopalgarh tehsil of Jodhpur District, Rajasthan, India.

Demographics
Sopra has population of 1264 of which 658 are males while 606 are females as per Population Census 2011. 659 of the population are literate.

In Sopra village population of children with age 0–6 is 140.

As per constitution of India and Panchyati Raaj Act, Sopra village is administrated by Sarpanch (Head of Village) who is elected representative of village.

People speak Marwari language but also understand Hindi.

Geography
It is a village surrounded by around 9 other villages and hills around it.

There is Chitorri Bhaker, Minger Bhakar and Nathji Maharaj Ka Bhakar on the village boundary. There is a village pond named Hivli Naadi.
The village has its own pond which mostly all villages of the area used to have.

Education
There is one middle school in the village and a non-government school on the outskirts of the village, which is funded by Bharti Airtel.
 Government middle school
 Satya Bharti School

Beliefs
People mostly use to worship goddess Baayasa, god Bhomiyaji and Thakurji (Krishna).

History
It is said that the village was established by the three brothers who travelled to the place long back ago from Kurchi (another village). All the people of the village are the progeny of the three brothers. As a result, the village is divided in three major "baas", namely "Uperly Baas", "Bhichily Baas" and "Khurali Baas".

The name "Sopra"
Later it changed to Sopda and Sopra.

Bhomiaji Maharaj Temple

It is located on a small hill outside the village nearby a pond.

References

Villages in Jodhpur district